Georges-Kévin Nkoudou Mbida (born 13 February 1995) is a professional footballer who plays as a winger for Süper Lig club Beşiktaş. Born in France, he represents the Cameroon national team.

Club career

France
He made his Ligue 1 debut on the opening game of the 2013–14 season on 11 August 2013 against SC Bastia. He replaced Serge Gakpé in the last minute of the game.

In June 2015, Nkoudou completed a move to Marseille for £1 million. His performances during the 2015–16 season led to him finishing 30th in UEFA's Best Player in Europe poll.

Tottenham Hotspur
On 31 August 2016, Nkoudou was transferred to Tottenham Hotspur for a reported fee of £11 million, signing a five-year deal with the club. He made his Spurs debut against Gillingham in the League Cup when he came on in the 60th minute for Christian Eriksen, this was followed by a very short debut in the league when he came on in the 90th minute against Middlesbrough.  He made 17 appearances for the club in the 2016–17 season, mostly as substitutes and starting only in two games – an EFL Cup game against Liverpool on 25 October 2016 and an FA Cup tie against Wycombe Wanderers on 28 January 2017.

In his first start of the 2017–18 season, Nkoudou scored his first goal for Tottenham in the Champions League group match against APOEL on 6 December 2017 that ended in a 3–0 win.

On 8 January 2018, Nkoudou completed a loan move to Premier League club Burnley until the end of the 2017–18 season. He failed to break into the first team regularly and was mainly a back-up to Jóhann Berg Guðmundsson, going on to make eight appearances.

Nkoudou returned to Tottenham for the 2018–19 season, but found it difficult to break into the first team.  He made his first appearance of the season coming off the bench in the fourth round League Cup match against West Ham. He again came on as a substitute in the League match against Fulham, and provided a crucial cross for the winning goal by Harry Winks.

On 31 January 2019, Nkoudou joined Monaco on loan for the remainder of the 2018–19 season.

Besiktas
Nkoudou signed for Besiktas on 22 August 2019 in a £4.6 million deal.

International career
Born in France, Nkoudou is of Cameroonian descent. Nkoudou was a youth international for France at various levels. In 24 April 2022 Nkoudou announced that he wants to play in Cameroon national football team. After three weeks on 13 May 2022 Cameroonian Football Federation announced that FIFA had approved the change in international eligibility of Nkoudou. A day after the announcement, he was called up to Cameroon national football team for the 2023 Africa Cup of Nations qualification. He planned to play his first match against Burundi on 9 June 2022, but withdrew injured.

Career statistics

Club

International

Honours

Club
Beşiktaş
 Süper Lig: 2020–21
 Turkish Cup: 2020–21
Turkish Super Cup: 2021

References

External links
 
 
 

1995 births
Living people
Sportspeople from Versailles, Yvelines
Cameroonian footballers
French sportspeople of Cameroonian descent
Cameroon international footballers
French footballers
France youth international footballers
France under-21 international footballers
Association football wingers
FC Nantes players
Olympique de Marseille players
Tottenham Hotspur F.C. players
Burnley F.C. players
AS Monaco FC players
Beşiktaş J.K. footballers
Ligue 1 players
Premier League players
Süper Lig players
2022 FIFA World Cup players
French expatriate footballers
Cameroonian expatriate footballers
Expatriate footballers in England
Expatriate footballers in Monaco
Expatriate footballers in Turkey
French expatriate sportspeople in England
French expatriate sportspeople in Monaco
French expatriate sportspeople in Turkey
Cameroonian expatriate sportspeople in Turkey
Footballers from Yvelines